Flood Tide is an adventure novel by Clive Cussler.  This is the 14th book featuring the author's primary protagonist, Dirk Pitt.

Plot Summary 
While recovering from his injuries suffered a month earlier as told in Shock Wave, Dirk stumbles upon mysterious activities around a peaceful lake in Washington state.  The coin of the realm for the wealthy, insatiably greedy Chinese smuggler is human lives: much of his vast fortune has been made smuggling Chinese immigrants into countries around the globe, including the United States.

Tracking the smuggler's activities leads Pitt from Washington State to Louisiana, where his quarry is constructing a huge shipping port in the middle of nowhere. Why has he chosen this unlikely location? The trail then leads to the race to find the site of the mysterious sinking of the ship that Chiang Kai-shek filled with treasure when he fled China in 1949, including the legendary boxes containing the bones of Peking Man that had vanished at the beginning of World War 1.

As Pitt prepares for a final showdown, he is faced with the most formidable foe he has ever encountered.

Characters in Flood Tide
Dirk Pitt – Director, Special Projects for the National Underwater and Marine Agency (NUMA)
Admiral James Sandecker – Chief Director of NUMA
Al Giordino – Assistant Director, Special Projects for NUMA.
Rudi Gunn – Director of Logistics for NUMA.
Julia Marie Lee - Undercover agent with the International Affairs Division of the U.S. Immigration and Naturalization Service. Born in San Francisco. Has dove-gray eyes, blue-black hair, and Asian features. She is tortured and abused by Shang's henchmen after being found out as a government agent, but Pitt saves her after being thrown into Orion Lake to die.
Qin Shang - The greedy, evil, Chinese shipping magnate who smuggles illegal Chinese immigrants into countries around the world; including the United States.
Bannon

Trivia
In July 2005, Major Casey Scharven, a U.S. Air Force officer stationed in Iraq, got his picture taken while sitting on Saddam Hussein's throne and holding a copy of Flood Tide.

Release details
1997, United States, Simon & Schuster , 1997, Hardcover.
2002, United States, Pocket Books New ED Edition, September 2, 2002, Paperback.
2003, United States, Pocket Books, January 1, 2003, Paperback.
2010, United States, Pocket Star Books, January 1, 2010 Paperback.

References

1997 American novels
American thriller novels
Dirk Pitt novels
Simon & Schuster books
Books with cover art by Paul Bacon